Flight Express is an airline based in Kinshasa, Democratic Republic of the Congo. It operates charter services from its base in Kinshasa.

History 
The airline was established in 2004 and is wholly owned by Tepavia Trans.

Fleet 
As of August 2006 the Flight Express fleet includes:
1 – Antonov An-26

See also		
 Transport in the Democratic Republic of the Congo

References

Defunct airlines of the Democratic Republic of the Congo
Airlines established in 2004
Companies based in Kinshasa